Remen may refer to:

 Rachel Naomi Remen (born 1938) American author, teacher, and alternative medicine practitioner
 Remen, an Ancient Egyptian unit of length

See also
Soil Yourself
Ramen, a noodle soup dish
Qaleh Remen, Iranian village